Ezzaki Badou (born 2 April 1959), nicknamed Zaki, is a Moroccan football coach and former professional player who played as a goalkeeper. He manages Sudan.

Playing career
Born in Sidi Kacem, Zaki represented AS Salé, Wydad AC, RCD Mallorca and Fath Union Sport during a 17-year professional career. With Mallorca, for which he signed in 1986 after being named by France Football as African Footballer of the Year, he won promotion to La Liga in 1989 while winning the Ricardo Zamora Trophy.

Zaki played for the Morocco national team in the 1986 FIFA World Cup and four Africa Cup of Nations. In the former tournament, held in Mexico, he helped his country to the round-of-16; additionally, the recipient of 76 full caps competed in the 1984 Summer Olympics.

In 2006, Zaki was selected by the Confederation of African Football as one of the best 200 African footballers of the last 50 years.

Coaching career
Zaki retired in 1993 at the age of 34, immediately becoming a manager. In 2002, after coaching a host of clubs, including former sides FUS and WAC, he was appointed at the helm of Morocco, leaving his post after three years and returning in May 2014. He left by mutual consent in February 2016.

Zaki subsequently returned to club duties, going on to be in charge of several sides.

On 12 March 2023, he was named as coach of Sudan, with his salary being paid by the Saudi Arabian FA as part of a co-operation agreement.

Honours

Player
Wydad Casablanca
Botola: 1977–78, 1985–86
Coupe du Trône: 1978, 1979, 1981
Mohammed V Cup: 1979

RCD Mallorca
Copa del Rey: Runners-up 1990–91

Manager
Wydad Casablanca
Coupe du Trône: 1998
CAF Cup runner-up: 1999
Arab Club Champions Cup runner-up: 2009
CR Belouizdad
Cup of Algeria: 2017
Morocco
Africa Cup of Nations runner-up: 2004

Individual
Best Moroccan Player: 1979, 1981, 1986, 1988
Best Moroccan Goalkeeper: 1978, 1979, 1986
CAF African Footballer of the Year: 1986
 Best Arab player of the year: 1986
 Golden Ball best coach in Algeria: 2017
Ricardo Zamora Trophy: 1988–89
 La Liga best goalkeeper: 1988, 1989, 1990
 Best Arab goalkeeper of the 20th century
 IFFHS Best African goalkeeper of the 20th century
 IFFHS All-time Morocco Men's Dream Team

References

External links

Real Mallorca bio 

1959 births
Living people
People from Sidi Kacem
Moroccan footballers
Association football goalkeepers
Botola players
Association Salé players
Wydad AC players
Fath Union Sport players
La Liga players
Segunda División players
RCD Mallorca players
Morocco international footballers
1986 FIFA World Cup players
1980 African Cup of Nations players
1986 African Cup of Nations players
1988 African Cup of Nations players
1992 African Cup of Nations players
Footballers at the 1984 Summer Olympics
Olympic footballers of Morocco
Competitors at the 1979 Mediterranean Games
Competitors at the 1983 Mediterranean Games
Mediterranean Games medalists in football
Mediterranean Games gold medalists for Morocco
Moroccan expatriate footballers
Expatriate footballers in Spain
Moroccan expatriate sportspeople in Spain
African Footballer of the Year winners
Moroccan football managers
Wydad AC managers
Fath Union Sport managers
SCC Mohammédia managers
CR Belouizdad managers
Morocco national football team managers
2004 African Cup of Nations managers
Expatriate football managers in Algeria
Moroccan expatriate sportspeople in Algeria
Kawkab Marrakech managers
Olympic Club de Safi managers
Maghreb de Fès managers
Ittihad Tanger managers
MC Oran managers
Difaâ Hassani El Jadidi managers
Botola managers